The 2014 Constellation Cup was the 5th Constellation Cup series played between Australia and New Zealand. The series, also known as the New World Netball Series, featured four netball test matches, played in October 2014. The Australia team was coached by Lisa Alexander and captained by Laura Geitz. New Zealand were coached by Waimarama Taumaunu and captained by Casey Kopua. Australia won the series 4–0. It was the first time since the Constellation Cup was introduced that one team had gained a clean sweep in the series.

Squads

Australia

Milestones
 Caitlin Bassett scored her 1,000th international goal, midway through the third quarter of the first test, on 2 October 2014.

New Zealand

Debuts
 Ameliaranne Wells made her senior debut for New Zealand in the second test on 8 October 2014.
 Temalisi Fakahokotau made her senior debut for New Zealand in the fourth test on 15 October 2014.

Matches

New World Netball Series

First test

Second test

Third test

Fourth test

References

2014
2014 in New Zealand netball
2014 in Australian netball
October 2014 sports events in New Zealand
October 2014 sports events in Australia